Arne Langset (25 February 1893 – 10 December 1971) was a Norwegian politician for the Liberal Party.

He served as a deputy representative to the Norwegian Parliament from Nordland during the terms 1950–1953 and 1954–1957.

References

1893 births
1971 deaths
Liberal Party (Norway) politicians
Deputy members of the Storting